Senator Zimmerman may refer to:

Jo Ann Zimmerman (1936–2019), Iowa State Senate
Peter C. Zimmerman (1887–1950), Oregon State Senate